The men's 200 metres hurdles was a track and field athletics event held as part of the Athletics at the 1904 Summer Olympics programme. It was the second, and final, time the event was held. Fivr athletes from the United States participated. The competition was held on September 1, 1904. The event was won by Harry Hillman; Frank Castleman took silver and George Poage bronze.

Background
This was the second and last time the event was held, with the previous time in 1900. None of the runners from the 1900 event returned. The three-time IC4A champion Edwin Clapp did not compete; 1902 AAU champion Harry Hillman did and was a "weak favorite" in the small field.

The United States made its second appearance.

Competition format

The low hurdles competition consisted of a single race, with only five men competing.

Records

These were the standing world and Olympic records (in seconds) prior to the 1904 Summer Olympics.

Harry Hillman set a new Olympic record with 24.6 seconds. As the competition has been discontinued, his Olympic record still stands.

Schedule

Results

References

Sources

 

Athletics at the 1904 Summer Olympics
Sprint hurdles at the Olympics